The 2019 season was the Houston Texans' 18th in the National Football League (NFL) and their sixth under head coach Bill O'Brien. It also marked the first full season without the ownership of Bob McNair, who died during the 2018 season. It was, however, the first season of full ownership of both Janice McNair and D. Cal McNair. For the first time in franchise history, the team played in London, against the Jacksonville Jaguars. On June 7, 2019, the Texans fired general manager Brian Gaine after only one season.

The Texans attempted to match their 11–5 record from 2018 despite trading defensive end Jadeveon Clowney to the Seattle Seahawks for a 3rd round pick and two players. However, they lost their third straight season opener to the New Orleans Saints. Their first win came in Week 2 against the Jaguars. With a Week 16 win over the Tampa Bay Buccaneers, the Texans clinched the AFC South for the fourth time in five seasons and their sixth overall division title. With the victory, the Texans also clinched their second 10-win season under O'Brien even though they failed to match their 11–5 record from last year.

They defeated the Buffalo Bills in the Wild Card round 22–19 in overtime despite falling behind 16–0. However, they lost to the eventual Super Bowl champion Kansas City Chiefs in the Divisional round 51–31, even after taking an early 24–0 lead. This marked the fourth time that the Texans' season had ended in the AFC Divisional Playoffs.

As of 2023, this represents the most recent winning season and playoff appearance for the Texans.

Draft

Staff

Final roster

Preseason

The Texans' preseason schedule was announced on April 9. Exact dates and times were finalized on April 23.

Schedule

Game summaries

Week 1: at Green Bay Packers

In the first preseason game of the 2019 season, the Texans had trouble holding on to the ball and committed four turnovers. Keke Coutee fumbled the ball on a muffed punt that was recovered in the end zone by Equanimeous St. Brown for a Packers' touchdown. Taiwan Jones also fumbled and lost the ball while Joe Webb threw two interceptions. Despite the turnovers, Houston out-gained Green Bay in total yards 412 vs. 237. After being down 18 points, the Texans rallied in the 4th quarter but the comeback fell short, losing to the Packers by 2.

Week 2: vs. Detroit Lions

The Texans received the opening kickoff, with their first team offense marching down the field with the drive ending with a 4-yard touchdown pass from Deshaun Watson to DeAndre Hopkins. Watson finished the game 5/7 for 60 yards and a touchdown. Jordan Ta'amu also saw some play at quarterback, finishing 1/1 for 3 yards. Joe Webb was in as Houston's quarterback for most of the game, looking improved from the previous pre-season game. The Texans' offense committed less turnovers, with the only turnovers being a Webb interception and a fumble by wide receiver Steven Mitchell.

Week 3: at Dallas Cowboys

Running back Lamar Miller was injured on the second play of the game, tearing both his ACL and MCL. The Texans' offensive line struggled all game, giving up 8 sacks for a loss of 38 yards. Deshaun Watson only saw brief playing time, fumbling the ball after being sacked by Taco Charlton; Watson would not re-enter the game after the fumble and did not attempt any passes. Joe Webb saw most of the quarterback play for Houston, throwing two interceptions and being sacked 4 times for a loss of 18 yards. Rookie free agent quarterback Jordan Ta'amu also saw play, completing 2 passes out of 5 attempts for 26 yards with no turnovers. Ta'amu was also sacked 3 times for a loss of 14 yards. The Texans only had 135 total yards with 4 turnovers while the Cowboys had 362 yards with no turnovers.

Week 4: vs. Los Angeles Rams

Two days after the game it was announced that the Texans had traded star defensive player Jadeveon Clowney to the Seattle Seahawks. The Texans received defensive ends Barkevious Mingo and Jacob Martin along with a 2020 third-round draft pick. Clowney was franchise tagged in March as a linebacker, but refused to sign the tag as he thought he should tagged a defensive end. Houston tried trading Clowney to the Miami Dolphins earlier in the week, but since Clowney had not signed his tag he had final say on where he would be traded to.

Regular season

Schedule

Note: Intra-division opponents are in bold text.

Game summaries

Week 1: at New Orleans Saints

The Texans' offense started off slow, only gaining 15 total yards on their first two drives. On the Saints' second drive, Drew Brees was intercepted in the red zone by Whitney Mercilus at the Houston 4-yard line, returning it for 2 yards. On the first play following the turnover, Deshaun Watson threw a 54-yard pass to Will Fuller; the drive ended with a 21-yard touchdown run from Watson. The Texans took a one-point lead with 37 seconds left in the game, only for the Saints to drive downfield and kick a 58-yard field goal to win the game.

The Texans started 0–1, losing their third straight season opener. It was also the second straight road game that they had lost on a last-second field goal, after their Week 16 game against the Philadelphia Eagles in 2018.

Week 2: vs. Jacksonville Jaguars

The Texans were leading 13–6 in the second half before the Jags scored a touchdown. However, the Jags failed on their two-point conversion attempt, which led the Texans to their first win of the season.

Week 3: at Los Angeles Chargers

During the third quarter, quarterback Deshaun Watson made the 50th touchdown pass of his career on a 15-yarder to tight end Jordan Akins.

Week 4: vs. Carolina Panthers

Week 5: vs. Atlanta Falcons

Atlanta's defense struggled to contain Houston's offense, giving up 592 yards. Deshaun Watson passed for 426 yards with five touchdowns, only five incompletions, and no interceptions for a perfect passer rating.

Week 6: at Kansas City Chiefs

This was assistant head coach Romeo Crennel's first visit to Kansas City in 7 years, where he served as their interim head coach for the final 3 Weeks of the 2011 season, most notably ending the Green Bay Packers' hopes of a perfect season that year, and was the Chiefs' head coach during the 2012 season.

Week 7: at Indianapolis Colts

Week 8: vs. Oakland Raiders

Week 9: at Jacksonville Jaguars
NFL London Games

Week 11: at Baltimore Ravens

Week 12: vs. Indianapolis Colts

Week 13: vs. New England Patriots

This was the Texans' first win over New England in a decade.

Week 14: vs. Denver Broncos
Battle Red Day

Week 15: at Tennessee Titans

Week 16: at Tampa Bay Buccaneers

Week 17: vs. Tennessee Titans

With the Kansas City Chiefs defeating the Los Angeles Chargers earlier in the afternoon, the Texans were locked in at the 4th seed for the playoffs. Houston rested several offensive and defensive starters with A. J. McCarron starting at quarterback, his first start since 2015 when he played for the Cincinnati Bengals.

Standings

Division

Conference

Postseason

Schedule

Game summaries

AFC Wild Card Playoffs: vs. (5) Buffalo Bills

Houston rallied back from a 16–0 3rd quarter deficit – having been held to 62 total yards in the first half – to win with 3:20 remaining in overtime on Ka'imi Fairbairn's 28-yard field goal, for Buffalo's 6th consecutive playoff loss since their last win in December 1995.

On the opening drive of the game, Bills quarterback Josh Allen rushed for 42 yards – the Bills' longest rush of the season – and then caught a 16-yard touchdown pass from receiver John Brown on a trick play to put Buffalo up 7–0. In the second quarter, Devin Singletary rushed for an 18-yard gain and Allen completed a 28-yard pass to Brown as the team drove 69 yards in 11 plays to go up 10–0 on Stephen Hauschka's 40-yard field goal. Then after a punt, Buffalo drove 74 yards in 15 plays to score on a second 40-yard field goal from Hauschka, giving them a 13–0 lead at half-time.

Five minutes into the third quarter, Texans receiver DeAndre Hopkins fumbled the ball while being tackled by Tre'Davious White, and Tremaine Edmunds recovered it on the Texans' 38-yard line. Buffalo then drove to the 12-yard line, but ended up settling for Hauschka's third field goal after Allen was sacked on third down by J. J. Watt, giving them a 16–0 lead. This time, Houston managed to respond, moving the ball 75 yards in 9 plays and scoring on a 20-yard touchdown run from quarterback Deshaun Watson; Watson also scored the ensuing 2-point conversion to make the score 16–8. On the Bills' ensuing drive, linebacker Whitney Mercilus forced a fumble while sacking Allen, which Jacob Martin recovered for the Texans at midfield with 14:18 remaining. Watson then completed a 20-yard pass to Kenny Stills that set up Fairbairn's 41-yard field goal, cutting the score to 16–11.

After Buffalo punted on their next drive, Watson completed a 41-yard pass – on the drive's second play – to Hopkins on the Buffalo 28-yard line, and later connected with tight end Darren Fells for 14 yards to bring up first and goal from the 1-yard line. Running back Carlos Hyde fumbled a pitch from Watson and was forced out of bounds for a 4-yard loss, before catching a 5-yard touchdown pass from Watson on the next play. Hopkins caught Watson's pass for a 2-point conversion, giving Houston their first lead at 19–16 with 4:42 remaining. Buffalo started out their next drive with a 38-yard completion from Allen to Singletary, and soon found themselves with a first down on the Texans' 25-yard line. After an incompletion, Frank Gore was dropped by Mike Adams for a 3-yard loss and then Allen was flagged for intentional grounding, pushing the team all the way back to the 42-yard line. Allen was sacked for a 19-yard loss by Martin on 4th-and-27, with a turnover on downs putting the Texans at Buffalo's 39-yard line with less than two minutes remaining. The Bills' defense managed to pin the Texans down, with Watson being stopped short by Star Lotulelei on 4th-and-1. Gaining the ball with 1:16 left, Allen led Buffalo 41 yards in 11 plays, including a 20-yard run by Allen, to score on Hauschka's 47-yard field goal, sending the game to overtime at 19–19.

After both teams punted on their first drive of overtime – Buffalo having punted after a penalty pushed the team out of field goal range – Houston drove 73 yards in 9 plays for the game-winning score; the key play of the drive was an 18-yard completion from Watson to running back Duke Johnson on 3rd-and-18 from the Texans' 19-yard line. Then Watson rushed for 5 yards, Stills caught a pass for 10 yards, and Hyde rushed 4 yards to the Bills' 44-yard line. On the next play, Watson evaded a sack attempt by two Buffalo defenders and fired a short pass to reserve running back Taiwan Jones, who took off for a 34-yard gain to Buffalo's 10-yard line. Fairbairn then kicked a 28-yard field goal to give Houston the victory.

The Texans were the only home team to win during the Wild Card round.

AFC Divisional Playoffs: at (2) Kansas City Chiefs

After falling behind 24–0, Kansas City suddenly buried the Texans with an NFL playoff record 7 consecutive touchdowns and a field goal over their next eight drives, starting with a shocking 28-point second quarter.

On the opening possession, Houston mounted a six-play, 75-yard drive that culminated in Deshaun Watson’s 54-yard touchdown pass to Kenny Stills on 3rd-and-1, giving the Texans an early 7–0 lead. The Chiefs then went three-and-out on their first drive, with tight end Travis Kelce dropping a potential first down pass on third down. Dustin Colquitt’s ensuing punt was blocked by Barkevious Mingo and recovered by Lonnie Johnson Jr., who returned it 10 yards for a touchdown that put the Texans up 14–0 less than five minutes into the game.

After both teams punted on their next drives, Chiefs returner Tyreek Hill muffed the ball inside his own 10-yard line which was recovered by Keion Crossen for Houston. Two plays later, Watson found tight end Darren Fells in the end zone for a 4-yard touchdown and a 21–0 lead late in the first quarter.

The next time Houston got the ball, they drove 48 yards in 9 plays to a 4th and inches on the Chiefs 13-yard line.  Rather than risk a conversion, the Texans settled for Ka'imi Fairbairn's 31-yard field goal to go up by 24 four minutes into the second quarter.  However, this would be the extent of their success, as they went on to be outscored 51-7 for the rest of the game.  First, Mecole Hardman returned the ensuing kickoff 58 yards to Houston's 42-yard line. Patrick Mahomes then threw a 25-yard pass to Kelce to get in the red zone before hitting running back Damien Williams for a 17-yard touchdown. After Houston went three-and-out on their next drive, they attempted a fake punt on 4th and 4 with a direct snap to Justin Reid who was tackled by Daniel Sorensen two yards short, giving Kansas City the ball at the Texans 33. Johnson was then called for pass interference to put the ball at the five before Mahomes hit Kelce in the end zone to cut the deficit to 10. On the ensuing kickoff, DeAndre Carter fumbled the ball due to a hit by Sorenson, and it went right into the arms of Kansas City's Darwin Thompson, who returned it to the Houston 6. Mahomes then threw his third touchdown pass in less than four minutes, and his second to Kelce, to make the score 24–21.

Taking possession at their own 10 with 2:47 left in the quarter, the Chiefs went on a 90-yard drive that included another pass interference on Johnson, while Mahomes rushed twice for 35 yards and completed a pair of 20-yard passes to Hill and Kelce. Finally, with 44 seconds left in the half, Mahomes threw another five-yard touchdown to Kelce to give the Chiefs their first lead of the game, 28–24. Mahomes’ four touchdown passes in the second quarter tied an NFL postseason record set by Doug Williams in Super Bowl XXII.  Fairbairn missed a 51-yard field goal as time expired in the half as the Chiefs became the first team in NFL history to fall behind by as many as 20 points in the first half but still lead at halftime.

The Chiefs would extend their lead on the opening possession of the third quarter, going 85 yards in 7 plays, the longest a 48-yard catch by Sammy Watkins.  Williams ran the ball in from the goal-line, increasing their lead to 34-24 after Harrison Butker missed the extra point. After forcing another Texans punt, the Chiefs took advantage of another pass interference penalty against Houston and a 28-yard completion from Mahomes to Kelce, scoring on their sixth straight possession with another Williams touchdown run to give them a 41–24 lead with 4:39 left in the quarter. Houston finally snapped Kansas City's 41-point run when Watson completed 4 passes for 80 yards and finished the drive with a 5-yard touchdown run, making the score 41–31 with 24 seconds left in the third quarter.

Kansas City would make it seven touchdowns in a row, setting a new postseason record, on a drive that included a 23-yard pass to Kelce and a 28-yard completion to Watkins, putting the ball at the Houston 8. Mahomes then found Blake Bell in the end zone, making the score 48–31.  On Houston's next drive, they turned the ball over on downs at the Chiefs 42.  A pair runs by Williams for gains of 11 and 26 yard to set up Butker's 24-yard field goal with 8:06 left to put Kansas City up by 20.  Houston then turned the ball over on downs on their final two possessions, the last coming when Frank Clark sacked Watson for a 17-yard loss on 4th-and-8 from the Kansas City 8-yard line.

Mahomes finished the game 23/35 for 321 yards and five touchdowns with no interceptions. He was also the leading rusher with 53 yards on seven carries. Kelce had 10 catches for 134 yards and three touchdowns, tying a Super Bowl-era postseason record.  Hardman had 6 kickoff returns for 142 yards.  Williams rushed for 47 yards, caught 2 passes for 21 yards, and scored 3 touchdowns. Watson threw for 388 yards and two touchdowns, while DeAndre Hopkins had 118 yards on nine catches. Kansas City's 24-point comeback was the fourth largest in postseason history, and they would go on to win Super Bowl LIV. The Texans became the first team in NFL postseason history to lose by 20 or more points after leading by 20 or more points.

Statistics

Team

Individual

Source:

References

External links

Houston
Houston Texans seasons
Houston Texans
AFC South championship seasons